Rigaud Benoit (1911–1986) had become one of the three or four most highly prized Haitian artists well before his death.

Early life
A native of Port-au-Prince, Benoit had been a shoemaker, musician, and taxi driver before making his living as a painter. He had also supplemented his income by painting pottery pieces he rarely signed or acknowledged.

Career
Benoit was an early member of the Haitian art movement known as Naive Art, so-called because of its members' limited formal training.  The movement was first recognized and promoted by the Centre d'Art, founded in 1944 by the American Quaker and World War II conscientious objector Dewitt Peters.

According to a widely repeated story, Benoit was working as Peters's chauffeur in 1944 when he saw some of the first works displayed at the Centre d'Art. He immediately decided he could do as well as any of the featured artists. Late in life Benoit denied that tale, insisting that he had merely visited the Centre out of curiosity before submitting his first works to Peters. He is featured, giving that account, in Krik? Krak! (Tales of a Nightmare), a VHS feature by Jac Avila and Vanyoska Gee (VHS, 78 minutes. Chicago: Facets Video, 1997).

However he got his start, his paintings rapidly became among the most highly sought of any Haitian artist. Then, in the early 1950s Benoit was one of a handful of artists asked to decorate the interior of the Cathedral of Sainte Trinité; his great mural, Nativity, stood above the high altar.  (The Catholic archbishop had — to his subsequent regret — denied permission for "mere Haitians" to decorate the Roman cathedral. The Episcopal bishop eagerly consented to the project. On seeing the result he exclaimed "Thank God!, they painted Haitians.") The cathedral and its many masterpieces was all but totally destroyed in the January 2010 earthquake.

Some of Benoit's later work was surrealistic, though he continued to produce scenes of Haitian life — narrative scenes — until his death.

Benoit married the daughter of his friend, the legendary Hector Hyppolite, the first Haitian artist to win international recognition — and still the most acclaimed — in international art circles.  They had four children.  Three of them — Yves Lafontant and Jacques Dorce, both adopted, and Rigaud Benoit, fils — are also accomplished artists.  (Benoit fils lives in New York, his sister in Montreal.)

Benoit's work is characterized by precise draftsmanship, muted colors (compared with most Haitian artists outside the Northern or Cap-Haïtien school), and often — in his narrative paintings — a sense of humor.  His surrealist paintings mostly depict voodoo scenes or deities lwas.  (Haïti is, the saying goes, "80 percent Catholic and 100 percent Vodou." In the past century evangelical Protestantism has reduced both figures.)

Benoit worked slowly — usually fewer than half-a-dozen pieces a year. Following a near-fatal automobile accident early in 1980, his production declined further.  He had, by that time, attained a measure of financial security: he owned a comfortable cottage on the outskirts of the Haitian capital.

References
A History of Haïtian Art 
Ned Hopkins's Collection of Haitian Art 
 

Haitian artists
1911 births
1986 deaths
Naïve painters
People from Port-au-Prince
20th-century Haitian painters
20th-century Haitian male artists
Haitian male painters